Raleigh Exec: The Raleigh Executive Jetport or Raleigh Exec Jetport at Sanford-Lee County  is a public use airport located seven nautical miles (8 mi, 13 km) northeast of the central business district of Sanford, a city in Lee County, North Carolina, United States. It is owned by the Sanford-Lee County Regional Airport Authority and was previously known as Sanford-Lee County Regional Airport. This airport is included in the National Plan of Integrated Airport Systems for 2011–2015, which categorized it as a reliever airport for Raleigh-Durham International Airport.

The jetport specializes in corporate and recreational flights into the Research Triangle Region — an area that includes Raleigh, Cary, Chapel Hill, Durham and the Research Triangle Park. It also hosts community-oriented special events; some recent examples include free flights for children as part of the EAA Young Eagles initiative, visits from the Memphis Belle and air shows by World War II warbirds.  Raleigh Exec conducts tours of its facilities for guests and offers full services, including Jet A and 100LL aircraft fuel, complete aircraft maintenance, avionics repair, pilot weather services, flight schools, secure hangars with limited-access gates, car service, courtesy and rental automobiles, and catering.

Although most U.S. airports use the same three-letter location identifier for the FAA and IATA, this airport is assigned TTA by the FAA but has no designation from the  IATA, which has assigned TTA to Plage Blanche Airport in Tan-Tan, Morocco. The airport's ICAO identifier is KTTA.

Facilities and aircraft 
Raleigh Exec covers an area of 700 acres (283 ha) at an elevation of 246 feet (75 m) above mean sea level. It has one asphalt paved runway, designated 3/21, which is 6,500 by 100 feet (1,981 x 30 m) with a weight capacity of 100,000 pounds, and a parallel taxiway, 50 feet wide also with a weight capacity of 100,000 pounds. The facility also has full lighting, signage and safety equipment, including an automated weather observation system (AWOS), instrument landing system (ILS), ground communicator outlet (GCO) and automatic dependent surveillance-broadcast system (ADS-B). Because the ADS-B is located on the airport grounds, pilots can monitor both ground and air traffic.

The O.A. "Buddy" Keller III Terminal opened in the fall of 2019 as the business and social center of the jetport. The two-story, 14,500-square-foot building includes a pilot lounge with "snooze rooms" and a live video feed of the ramp; one large conference room, a technology-enriched meeting space accommodating 30 people with 16 seated around the table; one small conference room, another technology-enriched meeting space with seating for eight around the table; and a second-floor observation deck with rocking chairs overlooking the runway.

For the 12-month period ending July 5, 2019, the airport had 62,780 aircraft operations, an average of 172 per day: 95% general aviation, 3% air taxi, and 2% military. Currently there are 163 aircraft based at Raleigh Exec.

Businesses at Raleigh Exec 
Several companies operate at Raleigh Exec. They include:
 
 AeroServices: avionics support to single engine piston, turbo-prop and jet business aircraft, including experimental, Warbird and light sport markets.
 Bandit Flight Team: aerial tributes in vintage military aircraft performed at major sporting events, military ceremonies, community gatherings and corporate activities.
 Elite Aircraft Services: aviation services, including consulting on aircraft acquisition, aircraft management and maintenance, and customized pilot training.

 Executive Flight Training: flight training using Piper Warrior, Piper Arrow and Cessna 172 aircraft. 
 MAG Aerospace: maintenance as well as avionics repair, installation and maintenance for single-piston through twin-turboprop aircraft.
 North Carolina Forest Service: which moved its regional aviation firefighting operations to Raleigh Exec in 2015. The facility serves as an operational base for five fixed-wing aircraft and two helicopters used to fight forest fires as well as the centralized maintenance location for the entire state.
 Odyssey Aero Club: checkout for members in FAA Technically Advanced Aircraft, including VFR and IFR checkouts, instrument training and commercial training.
 Wings of Carolina Flying Club: one of the oldest flying clubs in the nation. Founded in 1961, the nonprofit has more than 400 members from the Research Triangle, Southern Pines and Fayetteville areas. It offers aeronautical training, low-cost aviation education, social opportunities and inexpensive hourly aircraft rental for members.

Recent and future improvements 
Several significant expansions and improvements have recently concluded at Raleigh Exec. In addition to widening the taxiway to 50 feet and improving its weight capacity to 100,000 pounds in 2018, Raleigh Exec expanded its North Terminal area, adding sites for seven new corporate hangars 15,000 square feet or larger — each site with water and sewer service, fiber internet service, adjacent rail service, a public fire suppression system, a large apron and a new taxiway connector. The O.A. "Buddy" Keller III Terminal, a two-story, 14,500-square-foot terminal, opened in October 2019. Other upcoming projects include expansion of the airport's sewer capacity.

Economic impact 
Raleigh Exec contributed about $61.16 million to the local economy, according to a 2019 report published by the North Carolina Division of Aviation. Researchers estimated that the jetport generated $19.5 million per year in personal income and $2.376 million in state and local taxes. The airport was credited with creating about 470 jobs, including those located on the jetport grounds and other supported by activity taking place at the jetport.

References

External links 
 
 Raleigh Exec, official site
 Wings of Carolina Flying Club, official site
 Aerial image as of February 1999 from USGS The National Map
 

Airports in North Carolina
Transportation in Lee County, North Carolina
Buildings and structures in Lee County, North Carolina